Harry Edwards Gumbert (November 5, 1909 – January 4, 1995), nicknamed "Gunboat", was an American pitcher in Major League Baseball whose career extended for 21 professional seasons, including 15 years and 508 games pitched in the big leagues. Gumbert was born in Elizabeth, Pennsylvania, and was the great-nephew of two 19th-century major league players, Ad and Billy Gumbert.

Pitching career
Gumbert's career began in 1930 in minor league baseball, and after winning 19 games for the International League edition of the Baltimore Orioles in 1935, Gumbert was acquired by the New York Giants late in that season.

Gumbert was a member of the Giants' –37 National League champions, as both a starting pitcher and reliever. He worked in relief in both the 1936 World Series and the 1937 Fall Classic, and was treated harshly by the victorious New York Yankees, allowing 12 hits and 12 earned runs in four total games pitched and 3 innings. Traded to the St. Louis Cardinals in May , he worked for two more pennant winners and compiled a stellar .667 winning percentage (34–17) and earned run average (2.91) as a Redbird.  He also made a brief appearance (two-thirds of an inning pitched, and no earned runs allowed) in the 1942 World Series, in which the Cardinals defeated the Yankees in five games. Gumbert spent his final five seasons in MLB with the second division Cincinnati Reds and Pittsburgh Pirates. As a reliever with Cincinnati, he led the NL in games pitched (61), games finished (46) and saves (17) in 1948. He missed the 1945 season while serving in the United States Army.

In his 15-season big league career, Gumbert compiled a 143–113 win–loss record, allowing 2,186 hits and 721 bases on balls in 2,156 innings pitched. He struck out 709, and registered 96 complete games, 13 shut outs and 46 career saves. Gumbert also was known as one of the best fielding pitchers of his time, as he set a National League record for assists by a pitcher, recording 10 on May 23, 1938.

As a hitter, Gumbert posted a .184 batting average (130-for-708) with 50 runs, 5 home runs and 45 RBIs in 512 games. Defensively, he recorded a .979 fielding percentage which was 18 points higher than the league average at his position.

See also

 List of Major League Baseball annual saves leaders

References

Further reading

External links

1909 births
1995 deaths
People from Elizabeth, Pennsylvania
Baltimore Orioles (IL) players
Baseball players from Pennsylvania
Binghamton Triplets players
Charleroi Governors players
Cincinnati Reds players
Galveston Buccaneers players
Major League Baseball pitchers
Minor league baseball managers
New York Giants (NL) players
Pittsburgh Pirates players
Sacramento Solons players
St. Louis Cardinals players
Williamsport Grays players
York White Roses players
United States Army personnel of World War II